The bombing of Belgrade in World War II may refer to:

 The bombing of Belgrade in 1941, part of the Nazi invasion of Yugoslavia
 The bombing of Belgrade in 1944, part of the Allied bombing campaign